is a passenger railway station in the city of Sakuragawa, Ibaraki, Japan, operated by East Japan Railway Company (JR East).

Lines
Haguro Station is served by the Mito Line, and is located 32.8 km from the official starting point of the line at Oyama Station.

Station layout
The station consists one island platform , connected to the station building by a footbridge. The station is unattended.

Passenger statistics
In fiscal 2018, the station was used by an average of 671 passengers daily (boarding passengers only).

Platforms

History
Haguro Station was opened on 1 April 1904 as a freight station. Scheduled passenger operations began from 20 July 1910.  The station was absorbed into the JR East network upon the privatization of the Japanese National Railways (JNR) on 1 April 1987.

Surrounding area
 
Higashi-Naka Post Office

See also
 List of railway stations in Japan

References

External links

 Station information JR East Station Information 

Railway stations in Ibaraki Prefecture
Mito Line
Railway stations in Japan opened in 1910
Sakuragawa, Ibaraki